Peter Robinson (November 15, 1791 Pembroke, Merrimack County, New Hampshire – October 9, 1841 Binghamton, Broome County, New York) was an American lawyer and politician.

Life
He graduated from Dartmouth College, in Hanover, New Hampshire. In 1815, he moved to Binghamton, New York. There he studied law with Thomas G. Waterman, and was admitted to the bar in 1819. He was Surrogate of Broome County from 1821 to 1823.

He was a member of the New York State Assembly (Broome Co.) in 1826, 1827, 1828, 1829, 1830 and 1831; and was Speaker in 1829.

Sources
Obit at RootsWeb
Reminiscences of George W. Bull (pdf) The New York Times, December 30, 1879
Settlers Info at Geocities
The New York Civil List (1858; p. 412)

1791 births
1841 deaths
Speakers of the New York State Assembly
Politicians from Binghamton, New York
People from Pembroke, New Hampshire
New York (state) Jacksonians
19th-century American politicians
Dartmouth College alumni
Lawyers from Binghamton, New York